The Phoenix Trotting Park, was a horse racing track built in 1964 in Goodyear, Arizona, United States. It opened in 1965 and was run for about two and a half seasons. The large, futuristically designed structure gave an optimistic look for the 1960s.

Originally planned to be built for a cost of about $3 million, the facility ended up costing around $10 million. One of the proprietors and visionaries behind the park was James Dunnigan, the renowned New York horse racing financier. Ivone Grassetto, head of Impressa Eugenio Grassetto of Padua, Italy designed the grandstand and the main racing strip. Associate architect was Victor Gruen Associates of Los Angeles. The construction of the facility was undertaken as a joint venture by Gilbert & Dolan Enterprises and E.L. Farmer Construction Company, Inc. Various incentives during the events that were held, such as free parking and admission did initially lead to decent attendance, including an opening day showing of 12,000 people. However, a variety of factors led to the inevitable closing of the track. The hot weather of the desert caused events to be uncomfortable to attendees. The location provided limited means to control rain, leading to floods that caused accessibility problems. The park is also located about 20 miles outside of Phoenix and was built long before any major roads made the area easily accessible to those in the city or its suburbs.

Though closed in 1966, the 194-acre property had been continuously owned by either individuals or corporations/businesses.  And with the exception of a brief use for a movie, the property had sat abandoned since its closure.  As such, without any care, maintenance, or upkeep, the property showed its age.

The main building of the park was used in the 1998 Charlie/Martin Sheen movie No Code of Conduct. Part of the feature involved a large explosion occurring at the track.

In December 2015, the property was put on the market for $16.5 million. The structure was demolished in 2017.

Gallery

References

External links

Phoenix metropolitan area
Sports venues demolished in 2017
Sports venues in Maricopa County, Arizona
Defunct horse racing venues in the United States
Defunct sports venues in Arizona
1964 establishments in Arizona
1966 disestablishments in Arizona
Sports venues completed in 1964
Demolished buildings and structures in Arizona